Neoregelia carolinae, the blushing bromeliad, is a species of flowering plant in the genus Neoregelia. It is noted for its centre turning red when it's about to flower, from where the common name (blushing) is derived. This species is endemic to Brazil.

References

BSI Cultivar Registry Retrieved 11 October 2009

carolinae
Flora of Brazil